Robert Hugh Leckie (December 18, 1920 – December 24, 2001) was a United States Marine and an author of books about the military history of the United States, sports books, fiction books, autobiographies, and children's books. As a young man, he served with the 1st Marine Division during World War II; his service as a machine gunner and a scout during the war greatly influenced his work.

Leckie's war memoir, Helmet for My Pillow, along with Eugene B. Sledge's book With the Old Breed, formed the basis for the HBO series The Pacific (2010), the follow-up series to Band of Brothers. In the miniseries, Leckie is portrayed by James Badge Dale.

Early life and education
Leckie was born on December 18, 1920, in Philadelphia, Pennsylvania, to an Irish Catholic family of eight children. He grew up in Rutherford, New Jersey.

Early career and military service
He began his career as a writer in high school, as a sports writer for The Bergen Evening Record in Hackensack, New Jersey. On January 18, 1942, Leckie enlisted in the United States Marine Corps. He served in combat in the Pacific theater, as a scout and a machine gunner in H (How) Company, 2nd Battalion, 1st Marines, 1st Marine Division (H/2/1).

Leckie saw combat in the Battle of Tenaru and in the Guadalcanal Campaign and the Battle of Cape Gloucester, and he was wounded by a blast concussion in the Battle of Peleliu. Due to his wounds, he was evacuated to an army field hospital in the Pavuvu Islands. He returned to the United States in March 1945 and was honorably discharged shortly thereafter.

Military decorations
Leckie's decorations include:

Later career

Following World War II, Leckie worked as a reporter for the Associated Press, the Buffalo Courier-Express, the New York Journal American, the New York Daily News, and The Star-Ledger.

According to his wife Vera, in 1951 Leckie was inspired to write a memoir after seeing South Pacific on Broadway and walking out halfway through it. He said, "I have to tell the story of how it really was. I have to let people know the war wasn't a musical."

His first and best-selling book, Helmet for My Pillow, a war memoir, was published in 1957. Leckie subsequently wrote more than 40 books on American war history, spanning from the French and Indian War (1754–1763) to Desert Storm (1991).

Personal life
He married Vera Keller, and they had three children: David Leckie, Geoff and Joan.

Death
A longtime resident of Byram Township, New Jersey, Leckie died on December 24, 2001, six days after his 81st birthday, after fighting a long battle with Alzheimer's disease. He was survived by his wife of 55 years, his three children, two sisters, and six grandchildren. His remains were entombed at St. Joseph's Mausoleum in Newton, New Jersey.

Books

Military history books

Autobiography

Belles Lettres
These Are My Heroes: A Study of the Saints
Warfare: A Study of War
A Soldier-Priest Talks to Youth

Fiction books
Ordained

The Bloodborn
Forged in Blood
Blood of the Seventeen Fires

Books for younger readers

The Story of World War Two
The Story of World War One
The War in Korea
 "Summary: A review of America's major wars, from the French and Indian War to the War in Korea, with emphasis on eleven important battles: Quebec, Trenton, New Orleans, Mexico City, Chancellorsville, Appomattox, Santiago, Belleau Wood, Guadalcanal, Normandy, and Pusan-Inchon."
The World Turned Upside-Down
1812: The War Nobody Won
The Big Game
Keeper Play
Black Treasure (Sandy Steele #1, as by "Roger Barlow")
Danger at Mormon Crossing (Sandy Steele #2, as by "Roger Barlow")
Stormy Voyage (Sandy Steele #3, as by "Roger Barlow")
Fire at Red Lake (Sandy Steele #4, as by "Roger Barlow")
Secret Mission to Alaska (Sandy Steele #5, as by "Roger Barlow")
Troubled waters (Sandy Steele #6, as by "Roger Barlow")
According to World Catalogue, Robert Leckie, writing as "Roger Barlow", also wrote six juvenile boy adventure books called "The Sandy Steele" series; all six are available at Gutenberg.org.

See also

Eugene Sledge
Sidney Phillips

Notes

References

External links

 Robert Leckie as remembered by fellow H-Company Marine Sidney Phillips
 Historical interview footage of Robert Leckie
 

1920 births
2001 deaths
United States Marines
United States Marine Corps personnel of World War II
American military historians
American male non-fiction writers
American people of Irish descent
Burials in New Jersey
Historians of the American Civil War
Historians of the Korean War
Historians of World War II
People from Byram Township, New Jersey
People from Rutherford, New Jersey
Historians from New Jersey